A Carroll diagram, Lewis Carroll's square, biliteral diagram or a two-way table is a diagram used for grouping things in a yes/no fashion. Numbers or objects are either categorised as 'x' (having an attribute x) or 'not x' (not having an attribute 'x'). They are named after Lewis Carroll, the pseudonym of polymath Charles Lutwidge Dodgson.

Usage

Although Carroll diagrams can be as simple as the first one above, the most well known types are those similar to the second one, where two attributes are shown. The 'universe' of a Carroll diagram is contained within the boxes in the diagram, as any number or object has to either have an attribute or not have it.

Carroll diagrams are often learnt by schoolchildren, but they can also be used outside the field of education, since they are a tidy way of categorising and displaying information.

See also
 
 Diagram
 Karnaugh map
 Set theory
 Venn diagram
 The Game of Logic

References

Further reading

External links
 
 
 Lewis Carroll: Logic, Internet Encyclopedia of Philosophy

Graphical concepts in set theory
Diagrams
Grouping